Park Sung-woo (born 22 August 1971) is a former badminton player from South Korea who later became a national team coach.

Career 
Park won the men's singles title at the 1995 Asian Championships. He also won the 1995 Swedish Open. That same year, he made history in Korean badminton as the first ever South Korean to win a silver medal in the men's singles event at the World Championships.

In 1996, he finished as a semifinalist at the All England Open. At the 1996 Summer Olympics, he reached the quarterfinals. He reached a career high of world number 2 in World Ranking.

At the national level, Park who played for Dangjin, won the men's singles title at the 1996 Korean National Sports Festival.

After retiring from international tournaments, Park started a career as a Japanese national coach in 2006, and later moved back to his country, also as a national coach.

Personal life 
Park married Lim O-kyeong, a former South Korean Olympian handball player, in 1998, and the duo have a daughter. In 2007, Park and Lim then divorced after ten years of marriage.

Achievements

World Championships 
Men's singles

World Cup 
Men's singles

Asian Championships 
Men's singles

Asian Cup 
Men's singles

IBF World Grand Prix 
The World Badminton Grand Prix sanctioned by International Badminton Federation (IBF) from 1983 to 2006.

Men's singles

IBF International 
Men's singles

Men's doubles

References

External links 

1971 births
Living people
People from Dangjin
South Korean male badminton players
Badminton players at the 1996 Summer Olympics
Olympic badminton players of South Korea
Badminton players at the 1994 Asian Games
Badminton players at the 1998 Asian Games
Asian Games silver medalists for South Korea
Asian Games bronze medalists for South Korea
Asian Games medalists in badminton
Medalists at the 1994 Asian Games
Medalists at the 1998 Asian Games
Badminton coaches
Sportspeople from South Chungcheong Province